NSIC may refer to:

 National Scholastic Indoor Championships, a high school indoor track championship meet in the United States
 National Small Industries Corporation, a Government of India Enterprise, an ISO 9001:2008 certified Indian company
 National Space Intelligence Center, a United States Space Force unit
 National Spinal Injuries Centre, at Stoke Mandeville Hospital in Buckinghamshire, England
 National Sport Information Centre, Australia
 Northern Sun Intercollegiate Conference, an NCAA Division II conference in the Midwestern United States